Andrew Joseph Thynne (30 October 1847 – 27 February 1927) was a lawyer and politician in Queensland, Australia. He was a Member of the Queensland Legislative Council and Attorney-General of Queensland.

Early life 
Thynne son of Edward Thynne, was born in County Clare, Ireland. He was educated at the Christian Brothers' school, Ennistymon, by a private tutor, and at Queen's College, Galway, where he won a classical scholarship. He came to Brisbane with his parents in 1864, but the family soon after removed to Ipswich. Thynne entered the Queensland civil service, resigned later to take up the study of law, and was admitted as a solicitor in 1873, where he prospered in his profession.

Politics 
In 1882 Thynne was appointed a member of the Queensland Legislative Council. He was Minister for Justice and Attorney-General of Queensland in the second McIlwraith ministry from June to November 1888 and held the same position when the ministry was reconstructed under Morehead until August 1890. He was honorary minister in the McIlwraith-Nelson ministry from May to October 1893, and again Minister for Justice and Attorney-General of Queensland in the succeeding Nelson ministry from October 1893 to October 1894, then postmaster-general until March 1897, and from March 1896 to March 1898 minister for agriculture.

He took a particular interest in agriculture, and was largely responsible for the founding of the agricultural college at Gatton and for the state experimental farms. During this busy period of Thynne's life he also represented Queensland at the 1891 federal convention, at the 1894 Colonial Conference held in Ottawa, Ontario, Canada and at the postal conference at Hobart, Tasmania in 1895, and at the Pacific Cable conference in 1895–6. He was associated with the foundation of the University of Queensland, became a member of the first senate in 1910, vice-chancellor in 1916, and chancellor in 1926.

Military service 
Thynne had joined the Queensland Volunteer Defence Force when a young man in 1867 and had attained the rank of Lieutenant-Colonel. He was a first-rate rifle-shot, having twice won the Queen's prize, and more than once captained the Queensland rifle team. During the 1914–18 war he was appointed the first chairman of the Queensland Recruiting Committee. He carried out that role with immense energy until he resigned this post to carry on a campaign for conscription.

Other interests 
Thynne had a range of other interests. At various times he was president of the Queensland Ambulance Transport Brigade, the Boy Scouts Association, the Chamber of Agriculture, the Law Association, and was chairman of the Board of Technical Education. He retained his seat in the legislative council until it was abolished in 1922.

Personal life 
Thynne was married twice, (1) to Mary, daughter of William Cairncross, and (2) to Christina Jane (née MacPherson, the widow of Leslie Corrie), who survived him along with three sons and five daughters of the first marriage. Thynne was buried in South Brisbane Cemetery.

Thynne Street in the Canberra suburb of Bruce was dedicated in his name.

References
 

1847 births
1927 deaths
Members of the Queensland Legislative Council
Burials in South Brisbane Cemetery
Attorneys-General of Queensland
Colony of Queensland people